The belovite group is a group of phosphates in the apatite supergroup, related to fluorapatite

Belovite group members
Members of the belovite group include:
Belovite
Belovite-(Ce): 
Belovite-(La): 
Carlgieseckeite-(Nd): 
Deloneite: 
Fluorcaphite: 
Fluorstrophite: 
Kuannersuite-(Ce):

References